Karl William Marcus (12 January 1917 – 10 October 1989) was a Finnish film director, actor and screenwriter who used the screenname William Markus. He directed 13 films between 1953 and 1965. His film Miriam was entered into the 8th Berlin International Film Festival.

Markus was born in Liverpool, England, to a Finnish father and an English mother.

Selected filmography
 Kvinnan bakom allt (1951) – actor
 Miriam (1957)

References

External links

1917 births
1989 deaths
Film people from Liverpool
Finnish film directors
Finnish male film actors
Finnish screenwriters
British emigrants to Finland
20th-century Finnish male actors
20th-century screenwriters